Sir Roland Burrows  (12 February 1882 – 13 June 1952) was a British judge and legal writer.

Burrows was born in Maidstone, Kent, and educated at St John's College, Southend; the University of London, and Trinity Hall, Cambridge. He was called to the bar by the Inner Temple in January 1904, was appointed King's Counsel in 1932, and became a bencher of the Inner Temple in 1940. He was Recorder of Chichester from 1926 to 1928, and again in 1951. He was Recorder of Cambridge from 1928 onward. 

He was the managing editor of the second edition of Halsbury's Laws of England and the author of Interpretation of Documents. He was knighted in the 1946 New Year Honours.

References

1882 births
1952 deaths
People from Maidstone
Members of the Inner Temple
20th-century King's Counsel
Knights Bachelor
English barristers
Alumni of Trinity College, Cambridge
Alumni of the University of London
20th-century English lawyers